Ferdinand B. Stoss III is a United States Air Force major general who most recently served as the director of plans and policy of the United States Strategic Command. Previously, he was the Commander of the Twentieth Air Force.

Stoss is transitioning from active duty.

References

Living people
People from Reno, Nevada
Place of birth missing (living people)
Recipients of the Air Force Distinguished Service Medal
Recipients of the Defense Superior Service Medal
Recipients of the Legion of Merit
United States Air Force generals
Year of birth missing (living people)